Ryland Hall is a historic academic building located on the University of Richmond campus in Richmond, Virginia. The building was originally built for Richmond College, which together with Westhampton College became the University of Richmond in 1920. It was designed by architect Ralph Adams Cram and built in 1913 in the Collegiate Gothic style. The brick, stone, and concrete building consists of two parallel wings, Robert Ryland and Charles Ryland halls, set apart by a connecting loggia.  The three- to four-story building features leaded glass windows with Gothic tracery, decorative concrete sculptural elements, and a gable roof with slate shingles.

It was listed on the National Register of Historic Places in 2013.

In 2022 The University of Richmond renamed Ryland Hall in accordance with the Naming Principles adopted by the Board of Trustees on March 26, 2022. The Building is now known as the Humanities Building.

References

University of Richmond
University and college buildings on the National Register of Historic Places in Virginia
Gothic Revival architecture in Virginia
Buildings and structures completed in 1913
Buildings and structures in Richmond, Virginia
National Register of Historic Places in Richmond, Virginia
1913 establishments in Virginia